Andrej Babić is a Croatian songwriter who has written many Eurovision songs since 2003. He has written songs for four countries: Croatia, Bosnia and Herzegovina, Slovenia and Portugal.

Eurovision Song Contest entries

* Lyrics by Carlos Coelho
† Music co-written with Aleksandar Valenčić

National final entries

Entries in Dora (Croatia)
1997 - "Nemamo to pravo" by Ksenija Sobotinčić - 17th
1999 - "Miris ljubavi" by Teens - 14th
2000 - "Hajde reci što" by Teens - 4th
2003 - "Više nisam tvoja" by Claudia Beni - 1st

Entries in Beovizija (Serbia)
2009 - "Tvoje drugo ime je greh" (Твоје друго име је грех) by Dusan Zrnic - 7th

Entries in BH Eurosong (Bosnia and Herzegovina)
2005 - "Zovi" by Feminnem - 1st

Entries in EMA (Slovenia)
2005 - "Metulj" by Saša Lendero - 2nd
2006 - "Mandoline" by Saša Lendero - 2nd
2007 - "Cvet z juga" by Alenka Gotar - 1st
2009 - "Love Symphony" by Quartissimo - 1st
2010 - "Tukaj sem doma" by Manca Špik - 4th
2015 - "Alive" by Martina Majerle - Eliminated (Final)

Entries in Festival da Canção (Portugal)
2008 - "Senhora do mar (Negras águas)" by Vânia Fernandes - 1st
2010 -  "Canta por mim" by Catarina Pereira - 2nd
2011 - "Sobrevivo" by Carla Moreno - 11th
2012 - "Vida minha" by Filipa Sousa - 1st
2014 - "Mea Culpa" by Catarina Pereira - 2nd

Entries in Georgia
2010 - "For Eternity" by Sopho Nizharadze

Entries in Switzerland
2011 - "L'égoïste" by Evelyne Filipe

Entries in Belarus
2012 - "The Best Thing" by Gunesh

References

External links
Official MySpace page

Croatian songwriters
Living people
Year of birth missing (living people)